Joseph Hillström King (born June 4, 1972), better known by the pen name Joe Hill, is an American writer. His work includes the novels Heart-Shaped Box (2007), Horns (2010), NOS4A2 (2013), and The Fireman (2016); the short story collections 20th Century Ghosts (2005) and Strange Weather (2017); and the comic book series Locke & Key (2008–2013). He has won awards including Bram Stoker Awards, British Fantasy Awards, and an Eisner Award.

King is the son of authors Tabitha and Stephen King, and the brother of writer Owen King.

Early life
Joe Hill was born in 1972 to authors Tabitha King (née Spruce) and Stephen King. He was born and grew up in Bangor, Maine. His younger brother Owen King is also a writer. He has an older sister, Naomi King.

At age 9, he appeared in the 1982 film Creepshow, directed by George A. Romero, which co-starred and was written by his father.

Career
Hill chose to use an abbreviated form of his middle name for his professional surname in 1997, out of a desire to succeed based solely on his own merits rather than as the son of one of the world's best-selling and most-recognized living novelists. After achieving a degree of independent success, Hill publicly confirmed his identity in 2007, the year his first novel came out, after an article the previous year in Variety reported his identity.

Hill is a recipient of the Ray Bradbury Fellowship. He has also received the William L. Crawford award for best new fantasy writer in 2006, the A. E. Coppard Long Fiction Prize in 1999 for "Better Than Home" and the 2006 World Fantasy Award for Best Novella for "Voluntary Committal". His stories have appeared in a variety of magazines, such as "Subterranean Magazine", "Postscripts" and "The High Plains Literary Review", and in many anthologies, including "The Mammoth Book of Best New Horror" (ed. Stephen Jones) and "The Year's Best Fantasy and Horror" (ed. Ellen Datlow, Kelly Link & Gavin Grant).

Hill's first book, the limited edition collection 20th Century Ghosts (published in 2005 by PS Publishing), showcases fourteen of his short stories and won the Bram Stoker Award for Best Fiction Collection, together with the British Fantasy Award for Best Collection and Best Short Story for "Best New Horror". In October 2007, Hill's mainstream US and UK publishers reprinted 20th Century Ghosts, without the extras published in the 2005 slipcased versions, but including one new story.

Hill's first novel, Heart-Shaped Box, was published by William Morrow/HarperCollins on February 13, 2007 and by Victor Gollancz Ltd in UK in March 2007. The novel reached number eight on the New York Times bestseller list on April 1, 2007.

On September 23, 2007, at the thirty-first Fantasycon, the British Fantasy Society awarded Hill the first ever Sydney J. Bounds Best Newcomer Award. Hill's first professional sale was in 1997.

Among Hill's unpublished works is one partly completed story with his father ("But Only Darkness Loves Me"), which is held with the Stephen King papers at the Special Collections Unit of the Raymond H Fogler Library at the University of Maine in Orono, Maine.

Hill is the writer of Locke & Key, a comic book series published by IDW Publishing. The first issue, released on February 20, 2008, sold out of its initial publication run in one day. A collection of the series in limited form from Subterranean Press sold out within 24 hours of being announced.

Hill's second novel, Horns, was published in February 2010. A film based on the novel was released in 2014, directed by Alexandre Aja and starring Daniel Radcliffe and Juno Temple.

NOS4A2, his third novel, was published in April 2013. The novel peaked at number five on the New York Times Best Seller list.

Hill's fourth novel, The Fireman, was released in May 2016. It entered the New York Times Best Seller list at number one, making it his highest-ranked novel.

In 2018 a collection of four short novellas was released titled Strange Weather.

In 2019, In the Tall Grass, co-written with his father Stephen King, was released as a Netflix Original film. Filming for the Locke & Key TV series, also by Netflix, began in the middle of January 2019 and the first season aired in February 2020. Also, AMC began broadcasting a TV series of NOS4A2 in July 2019.

Shudder announced in 2017 that their upcoming series reboot of Creepshow would contain an adaptation of Hill's short story "By the Silver Waters of Lake Champlain". The series aired its first season in September 2019 and was renewed for a second season as well.

Following DC Comics's announcement in June 2019 that it would suspend publication of its Vertigo Comics imprint, they announced that Hill would oversee and share the writing for a new horror line, Hill House Comics. Hill started talking about the Hill House line in 2017 with editor Mark Doyle. The line was originally to be titled Vertigo Fall, then Joe Hill's Vertigo Fall, before eventually being renamed.

Personal life

In 1999, Joe Hill married Leanora Legrand, whom he had met at Vassar College. They have three children together. The couple divorced in 2010. 

In 2018, he married British publisher Gillian Redfearn. Their twins were born in 2022.

Awards
 "Better Than Home" (A. E. Coppard Long Fiction Prize)
 "Voluntary Committal" (World Fantasy Award for Best Novella)
 20th Century Ghosts (Bradbury Fellowship)
 20th Century Ghosts (2005 Bram Stoker Award for Best Fiction Collection)
 20th Century Ghosts (2005 International Horror Guild Award for Best Collection)
 "Best New Horror" (2005 Bram Stoker Award for Best Long Fiction)
 20th Century Ghosts (2006 British Fantasy Award for Best Collection)
 20th Century Ghosts (2006 William L. Crawford award for best new fantasy writer)
 "Best New Horror" (2006 British Fantasy Award for Best Short Story)
 Sydney J. Bounds Best Newcomer Award – 2007
 Heart-Shaped Box (2007 Bram Stoker Award for Best First Novel)
 Heart-Shaped Box (2008 International Thriller Writers Award for Best First Novel)
 Locke & Key (2009 British Fantasy Award for Comic/Graphic Novel)
 Locke & Key (2011 Eisner Award for Best Writer)
 Locke & Key (2012 British Fantasy Award for Comic/Graphic Novel)
 The Fireman (2017 Locus Award for Best Horror Novel)
 Strange Weather (2017 Bram Stoker Award for Best Fiction Collection)
 Strange Weather (2018 British Fantasy Award for Best Collection)

Bibliography

Novels
 Heart-Shaped Box (2007)
 Horns (2010)
 NOS4A2 (2013) (published as NOS4R2 in the United Kingdom)
 The Fireman (2016)

Short stories

All short stories
All short stories (dates by original magazine or anthology publication):
 "The Lady Rests" (1997), Palace Corbie 7
 "The Collaborators" (1998), Implosion 8
 "Better Than Home" (1999), A. E. Coppard Long Fiction Prize Series, stand-alone chapbook
 "The Saved" (2001), The Clackamas Literary Review spring/summer issue
 "Pop Art" (2001), With Signs & Wonders, Invisible Cities Press anthology
 "20th Century Ghost" (2002), The High Plains Literary Review, journal's final issue
 "The Widow's Breakfast" (2002), The Clackamas Literary Review spring/summer issue
 "You Will Hear the Locust Sing" (2004), The Third Alternative 37
 "Abraham's Boys" (2004), The Many Faces of Van Helsing, anthology
 "The Black Phone" (2004), The Third Alternative 39
 "Dead-Wood" (2005), Subterranean Press February online newsletter
 "Last Breath" (2005), Subterranean Magazine 2
 "Best New Horror" (2005), Postscripts 3
 "Voluntary Committal" (2005), Subterranean Press stand-alone chapbook
 "In the Rundown" (2005), Crimewave 8
 "Scheherazade's Typewriter" (2005), 20th Century Ghosts, within the book's acknowledgments section
 "The Cape" (2005), 20th Century Ghosts, original to collection
 "My Father's Mask" (2005), 20th Century Ghosts, original to collection
 "Bobby Conroy Comes Back from the Dead" (2005), Postscripts 5
 "Thumbprint" (2007), Postscripts 10
 "Jude Confronts Global Warming" (2007), Subterranean Press online magazine, spring issue
 "Gunpowder" (2008), PS Publishing stand-alone novella
 "Throttle" (2009, written in collaboration with Stephen King), He Is Legend: An Anthology Celebrating Richard Matheson (also included in the audiobook Road Rage)
 "Twittering from the Circus of the Dead" (2010), The New Dead, edited by Christopher Golden
 "The Devil on the Staircase" (2010), Stories: All-New Tales, edited by Al Sarrantonio and Neil Gaiman
 "Wolverton Station" (2011), Subterranean: Tales of Dark Fantasy 2, edited by William Schafer
 "In the Tall Grass" (2012, written in collaboration with Stephen King), Esquire, June/July and August issues
 "By the Silver Water of Lake Champlain" (2012), Shadow Show: All New Stories in Celebration of Ray Bradbury, edited by Mort Castle and Sam Weller
 "Snapshot, 1988" (2016); or "Snapshot" (2017), Strange Weather 1
 "Loaded" (2017), Strange Weather 2
 "Aloft" (2017), Strange Weather 3
 "Rain" (2017), Strange Weather 4
 "All I Care About is You" (2017), The Weight of Words, edited by Dave McKean and Willaim Schafer
 "Dark Carousel" (2018), vinyl-first audiobook  (Collected in Full Throttle)
 "You Are Released" (2018), Flight or Fright, edited by Stephen King and Bev Vincent
 "Faun" (2019), At Home in the Dark, edited by Lawrence Block
 "Late Returns", collected in Full Throttle
 "Mums", collected in Full Throttle

Collections and uncollected short stories

Collections:
 20th Century Ghosts (2005), collection of 18 short stories:
 "Best New Horror", "20th Century Ghost", "Pop Art", "You Will Hear The Locust Sing", "Abraham's Boys", "Better Than Home", "The Black Phone", "In The Rundown", "The Cape", "Last Breath", "Dead-Wood", "The Widow's Breakfast", "My Father's Mask", "Voluntary Committal", "Bobby Conroy Comes Back From The Dead", "The Saved", "The Black Phone: The Missing Chapter", "Scheherazade's Typewriter"
 Strange Weather (2017), collection of 4 novellas:
 "Snapshot", "Loaded", "Aloft", "Rain"
 Full Throttle (2019), collection of 4 short stories, 9 novelettes and 1 novella:
 "Throttle" (novelette, with Stephen King), "Dark Carousel" (novelette), "Wolverton Station", "By the Silver Water of Lake Champlain" (novelette), "Faun" (novelette), "Late Returns" (novelette), "All I Care About Is You" (novelette), "Thumbprint" (novelette), "The Devil on the Staircase", "Twittering from the Circus of the Dead", "Mums" (novelette), "In the Tall Grass" (novella, with Stephen King), "You Are Released" (novelette), "A Little Sorrow"

Uncollected short stories:
 "The Lady Rests" (1997), Palace Corbie 7
 "The Collaborators" (1998), Implosion 8
 "Jude Confronts Global Warming" (2007), Subterranean Press online magazine, spring issue
 "Gunpowder" (2008), PS Publishing stand-alone novella

Comics
 Locke & Key (2008–2013), illustrated by Gabriel Rodriguez
 Kodiak (2010), one-shot, co-written with Jason Ciaramella and illustrated by Nat Jones
 The Cape series, co-written with Jason Ciaramella, based on the short story "The Cape":
 The Cape (2007), illustrated by Zach Howard:
 The Cape (2010), one-shot 
 The Cape (2011), mini-series
 The Cape: 1969 (2012), prequel, mini-series, illustrated by Nelson Daniel
 The Cape: Fallen (2018), mini-series, illustrated by Zach Howard
 Thumbprint (2013), co-written with Jason Ciaramella
 Wraith: Welcome to Christmasland (2014), mini-series, illustrated by C. P. Wilson III
 Shadow Show: Stories in Celebration of Ray Bradbury: "By the Silver Water of Lake Champlain" (2014), one-shot, adapted by Jason Ciaramella and illustrated by C. P. Wilson III
 Tales from the Darkside (2016), illustrated by Gabriel Rodriguez
 Basketful of Heads (2019), mini-series, illustrated by Leomacs
 Plunge (2019), mini-series, illustrated by Stuart Immonen
 Sea Dogs (2019), mini-series
 Dying is Easy (2020), illustrated by Martin Simmonds
 Rain (2022), mini-series, adapted by David M. Booher and illustrated by Zoe Thorogood, based on the novella Rain

Poetry
 "The Sundial Man" (2010)

Non-fiction
 A Little Silver Book of Sharp Shiny Slivers (2017), collection of essays

Anthology appearances
Below is a list of Hill's short fiction which has been reprinted.
 "20th Century Ghost": "The Mammoth Book of Best New Horror, Volume Fourteen" (2003), ed. Stephen Jones
 "My Father's Mask": "The Year's Best Fantasy and Horror, 19th Annual Collection" (2006), ed. Ellen Datlow, Kelly Link and Gavin Grant
 "Best New Horror": "The Mammoth Book of Best New Horror, Volume Seventeen" (2006), ed. Stephen Jones
 "The Cape": "Horror: The Best of the Year, 2006 Edition" (2006), ed. John Gregory Betancourt and Sean Wallace
 "Thumbprint": "The Mammoth Book of Best New Horror, Volume Nineteen" (2008), ed. Stephen Jones
 "Bobby Conroy Comes Back from the Dead": "The Living Dead" (2008), ed. John Joseph Adams
 "20th Century Ghost": "Poe's Children: The New Horror" (2008), ed. Peter Straub
"Pop Art": "American Fantastic Tales: Terror and the Uncanny from the 1940s to Now" (2009), ed. Peter Straub
"Abraham’s Boys": "By Blood We Live" (2009), ed. John Joseph Adams
 "20th Century Ghost": "The Mammoth Book of the Best of Best New Horror" (2010), ed. Stephen Jones
 "My Father's Mask": " Darkness: Two Decades of Modern Horror " (2010), ed. Ellen Datlow
 "Throttle" (with Stephen King): "The Mammoth Book of Best New Horror, Volume Twenty-One" (2010), ed. Stephen Jones
 "You Are Released": Flight or Fright (2018), ed. Stephen King and Bev Vincent

Miscellaneous credits
 "Pop Art" was reprinted in 2007 by Subterranean Press as a chapbook featuring illustrations by Gahan Wilson. As well, 52 lettered (A–ZZ) hard covers and 150 numbered soft covered chapbooks were signed by Hill.
 "Fanboyz", a comic script, was written for Spider-Man Unlimited 8 (2005). The story was illustrated by Seth Fisher.
 "The Saved", first published in The Clackamas Literary Review in 2001 and also as part of the bonus material included in the 2005 deluxe slipcased edition of 20th Century Ghosts, was reprinted in December 2007 as part of PS Publishing's annual Holiday Chapbook series, available, free of charge, to subscribers of the quarterly magazine Postscripts.
 "Thumbprint", first published in Postscripts #10 in 2007, was reprinted as a chapbook in summer 2008 to accompany the anthology Subterranean: Tales of Dark Fantasy published by Subterranean Press.
 Hill was selected to serve as the guest editor of the first (2015) volume of Houghton Mifflin Harcourt's series The Best American Science Fiction and Fantasy.
 Tales from the Darkside: Script Book was published in 2016 collecting three original scrips of the failed TV series reboot.
 The Fireman was referenced in Episode 0 of the podcast Point Mystic, which also featured Joe Hill's voice and likeness.

Screenwriting credits
Fade Away (2005) (unproduced screenplay co-written with Owen King)
Tales From The Darkside (2015) (unproduced pilot episode)
Locke & Key (2018) (unaired pilot episode)
Locke & Key (2019) (pilot episode co-written with Eli Coleite)

Adaptations

 Pop Art (2008), short film directed by Amanda Boyle, based on short story "Pop Art"
 Abraham's Boys (2009), short film directed by Dorothy Street, based on short story "Abraham's Boys"
 Locke & Key (2011), TV pilot for Fox directed by Mark Romanek, based on comic Locke & Key
 Horns (2013), film directed by Alexandre Aja, based on novel Horns
 Locke & Key (2017), TV pilot for Hulu, based on comic Locke & Key
 In the Tall Grass (2019), film directed by Vincenzo Natali, based on novella "In the Tall Grass"
 "By the Silver Water of Lake Champlain" (2019), segment of series Creepshow, directed by Tom Savini, based on novelette "By the Silver Water of Lake Champlain"
 NOS4A2 (2019-2020), series created by Jami O'Brien, based on novel NOS4A2
 Locke & Key (2020), series created by Carlton Cuse, Meredith Averill and Aron Eli Coleite, based on comic Locke & Key
 "Twittering from the Circus of the Dead" (2020), segment of series Creepshow, directed by Greg Nicotero, based on short story "Twittering from the Circus of the Dead"
 The Black Phone (2021), film directed by Scott Derrickson, based on short story The Black Phone
 "Mums" (2021), segment of series Creepshow, directed by Rusty Cundieff, based on novelette "Mums"

References

External links

 
 
 

21st-century American novelists
American horror writers
Ghost story writers
Eisner Award winners for Best Writer
World Fantasy Award-winning writers
Writers from Bangor, Maine
Vassar College alumni
Stephen King
1972 births
Living people
Dark fantasy writers
American male novelists
Chapbook writers
Novelists from Maine
Weird fiction writers
21st-century American male writers
21st-century pseudonymous writers